Buckskin Mountain is a  mountain ridge that spans from Coconino County, Arizona to Kane County, Utah in the United States, that is divided almost equally between the two counties.

Description

The ridge lies at the north end of the Kaibab Plateau, of the North Rim of the Grand Canyon; the Kanab and Paria plateaus of Arizona, lie southwest, and southeast. Buckskin Mountain borders the Vermilion Cliffs National Monument, southeast. The north portion of the ridge in Utah was located in the Grand Staircase–Escalante National Monument, but was in one of the sections that was later removed from the monument. The northeast ridge terminus is Buckskin Gulch. To the ridge's east, across the narrow Coyote Valley, of the north-flowing Coyote Wash, lies the Coyote Buttes of Arizona. The ridge trends approximately north-northeast, and descends steeply on its southeast flank to Coyote Wash.

Prior to 1989, the United States Geological Survey (USGS) had identified three difference mountains in the area named Buckskin Mountain: two in northern Coconino County, Arizona. and one near the southern edge of central Kane County Utah. While the USGS database still lists all three, a decision card for one of the Coconino County landforms, dated February 9, 1989, indicates two significant changes.<ref.</ref> First, it defined the landform as a ridge, rather than a summit. Second, it provided a description (with associated coordinates) that ran from the Rock Canyon immediately north of the border of the Kaibab National Forest northeasterly to western part of the Kaibab Gulch (which is also known as the Buckskin Gulch). This new description and the new coordinates encompass the locations of the three summits—effectively combining the three into a single landform.

Access
The northeast, east, and south of Buckskin Mountain can be accessed from U.S. Route 89A (US 89A) from House Rock, Arizona, via the House Rock Road (BLM Road 1065).

At the ridges northwest flank, US‑89 turns northeasterly, with access by unimproved roads.

The unimproved routes on the west, and southeast also connect to an improved route at the south terminus of the ridge.

See also

References

External links

 Lat-long.com: Buckskin Mountain — approximate center of the range.

Ridges of Arizona
Ridges of Utah
Landforms of Coconino County, Arizona
Landforms of Kane County, Utah
Colorado Plateau